Volnoye is a rural locality (a selo) and the administrative center of Volnensky Selsoviet of Arkharinsky District, Amur Oblast, Russia. The population was 84 in 2018. There are 5 streets.

Geography 
The village is located on the right bank of the Arkhara River, 28 km southwest of Arkhara (the district's administrative centre) by road. Leninskoye is the nearest rural locality.

References 

Rural localities in Arkharinsky District